Alda Björk Ólafsdóttir, better known as simply Alda, is an Icelandic pop singer and songwriter.

After success in her home country and stints with the groups Urban K Loud, Munchie and Exodus, Alda moved to London and received a solo record contract with Wildstar Records, scoring two top 20 hit singles on the UK Singles Chart in 1998; "Real Good Time" and "Girls Night Out". Her debut album, Out of Alda, was also released in 1998.

Discography

Albums
Out of Alda (1998), CNR Music

Singles
with Urban K: Loud
"Let Your Body Move (Charlie)" (1994), Three Big CowboysSolo'''
"Real Good Time" (1998), Wildstar Records – UK No. 7
"Girls Night Out" (1998), Wildstar Records – UK No. 20

References

External links

1966 births
Living people
20th-century Icelandic women singers
Icelandic pop singers
Icelandic expatriates in England
Date of birth missing (living people)